Bihta railway station, (station code: BTA), is a railway station serving the town of Bihta in the Patna district in the Indian state of Bihar. It located 28 km west of Patna Junction railway station.

Bihta railway station is connected to most of the major cities in India, which lies in between Delhi–Kolkata main line which serves Bihta with numerous trains. Bihta is well connected to Patna, Delhi, Mumbai, Kolkata, Mughalsarai and a few other cities.

Platforms 
There are 3 platforms in Bihta railway station. There are two foot overbridges (FOB) for reaching as well as crossing the platforms.

Trains 
There are several trains that stop at Bihta railway station:

References 

Railway stations in Patna district
Danapur railway division